Siglé is a department or commune of Boulkiemdé Province in central Burkina Faso. As of 2005 it has a population of 31,279. Its capital lies at the town of Siglé.

Towns and villages
SigléBaloghoBologoBoukouDacisséDaurnogomdéKouriaLalléMakoula
NafougoPalagréPalilgogoSéguédinSemtengaTemnaoréTiaTioYargo

References

Departments of Burkina Faso
Boulkiemdé Province